Samat Muratov (born 17 March 1976) is a Kazakhstani diver. He competed in the men's 10 metre platform event at the 1996 Summer Olympics.

References

1976 births
Living people
Kazakhstani male divers
Olympic divers of Kazakhstan
Divers at the 1996 Summer Olympics
Place of birth missing (living people)